This is a list of sheep breeds usually considered to originate or have developed in Australia and New Zealand. Some may have complex or obscure histories, so inclusion here does not necessarily imply that a breed is predominantly or exclusively from those countries.

References

Sheep